The 1968 season in Japanese football.

League tables

Japan Soccer League

Promotion/relegation Series

No relegations.

Team of the Year

References 

1968
1
Jap
Jap